Swale or Swales may refer to:

Topography
 Swale (landform), a low tract of land
 Bioswale, landform designed to remove silt and pollution
 Swales, found in the formation of Hummocky cross-stratification

Geography
 River Swale, in North Yorkshire, England
 The Swale, a channel separating mainland Kent from the Isle of Sheppey, England
 Borough of Swale, a local government district in Kent, England
 Swale railway station

Other uses
 Swale (horse), an American Thoroughbred racehorse
 Swales (surname), a surname
 Swales Aerospace, a U.S. aerospace and defense company from 1978 to 2007, founded by Tom Swales